Eurybia surculosa, commonly known as the creeping aster, is an herbaceous perennial in the family Asteraceae that was previously treated in the genus Aster. It is native to the eastern United States where it is found in sandy soils along the coastal plain, though when E. compacta is also present, it exists farther inland in the southern Appalachian Mountains and the Cumberland Plateau. Although the species is not seriously threatened, it is locally endangered in Virginia and Alabama. The flowers, which have bluish violet ray florets and pale yellow disc florets that eventually turn purplish, emerge in summer and persist into the fall.

Distribution and habitat
Eurybia surculosa in native to the eastern United States where is occurs both along the coastal plain, especially in the north of its range, as well as in the southern Appalachians. It tends not to coexist with E. compacta, and where this plant occurs, E. surculosa is usually confined to inland areas and the mountains. There are isolated populations in Massachusetts and Connecticut in the north, and then a continuous range from Delaware and Maryland south through Virginia and the Carolinas to Georgia. To the west it is present in Alabama, Tennessee, Kentucky and Ohio, though it is absent in West Virginia It typically grows at elevations of 200 to 1500 meters (670–5000 feet) in both dry and wet sandy soils. Its habitats include open areas, pinelands, oak scrub, clearings, bogs, as well as along roadsides.

References

Flora of the Eastern United States
surculosa
Plants described in 1803